Shawn Everett (born July 6, 1982) is a Canadian music engineer and producer best known for his work with Alabama Shakes, Kacey Musgraves, The War on Drugs, The Killers, and Julian Casablancas. Everett has won six Grammy Awards.

Early life
Everett was born and raised in Bragg Creek, Alberta.  After graduating high school, Everett was accepted as a Work-Study participant in the Audio program in Music & Sound at The Banff Centre. Everett relocated to Los Angeles in 2005 and began engineering for producer Tony Berg, former A&R Executive for Geffen Records and Virgin Music.

Career

Julian Casablancas+The Voidz
Shawn served as the producer on Tyranny, the 2014 debut release from Julian Casablancas+The Voidz.  He is featured in the 'Can I VHS you?' video with the band and also appears in the video for 'Human Sadness', which was directed by Warren Fu.

Awards and nominations
Shawn Everett has won six Grammy awards and two Juno awards.

In February 2016, Everett and mastering engineer Bob Ludwig won the "Best Engineered Album, Non-Classical" Grammy Award for their work on Sound & Color by Alabama Shakes. Everett won an additional Grammy for Best Alternative Music Album for Sound & Color.

In 2016 Everett won the Canadian Juno Awards for Recording Engineer of the Year for "Don't Wanna Fight", "Gimme All Your Love" from Sound & Color by Alabama Shakes.

In 2018 Everett was nominated for the "Best Engineered Album, Non-Classical" Grammy for his work on No Shape by Perfume Genius. He won a Grammy for "Best Rock Album" for his work on A Deeper Understanding by The War on Drugs.

In February 2018, Everett was nominated for Recording Engineer of the Year at the Canadian Juno awards for his work on A Deeper Understanding by The War on Drugs and No Shape by Perfume Genius.

In February 2019, Everett won Album of the Year and Best Country Album at the Grammys. Both awards were for his work mixing the album ‘Golden Hour’ by Kacey Musgraves.

In March 2019, Everett won Recording Engineer of Year at the Canadian Juno awards for his work on ‘Golden Hour’ by Kacey Musgraves.

In December 2020, Everett was nominated three times in the Best Engineered Album, Non-Classical category for his work on Devon Gilfillian's Black Hole Rainbow, Beck's Hyperspace, and Brittany Howard's Jaime. He was the second engineer to achieve a triple nomination in the category. The first was Ed Cherney whose work on Bonnie Raitt's “Longing in their Hearts” won at the 1995 Grammys.

In March 2021, Everett won the "Best Engineered Album, Non-Classical" Grammy Award for his work on 'Hyperspace' by Beck.

In November 2022, Everett was nominated for "Best Alternative Album" for his work on 'Cool It Down' by Yeah Yeah Yeahs and "Best Album" for his work on '30' by Adele

Credits

References 

Updated Link:  "Lucius and the Recording Process" Delicious Audio, 30 May 2012.

External links
 Shawn Everett Official Website

1982 births
Living people
Canadian audio engineers
Canadian record producers
Grammy Award winners
Juno Award for Recording Engineer of the Year winners